Katarzyna Szafrańska (born 10 July 1965) is a Polish alpine skier. She competed in two events at the 1988 Winter Olympics.

References

1965 births
Living people
Polish female alpine skiers
Olympic alpine skiers of Poland
Alpine skiers at the 1988 Winter Olympics
Sportspeople from Nowy Sącz
Universiade bronze medalists for Poland
Universiade medalists in alpine skiing
Competitors at the 1991 Winter Universiade
20th-century Polish women